Peter J. Lucido (born July 31, 1960) is an American Republican politician. He currently serves as the prosecutor of Macomb County, Michigan. He formerly served as a member of the Michigan Senate, and was  Senate Majority Whip.

Political career
Lucido's political career started with running to succeed the term-limited Pete Lund to represent the 36th district in the Michigan House of Representatives. Lucido's opponent for the Republican nomination against then-Shelby Township Clerk Stan Grot. The race was called the most expensive race for a state House seat in Michigan history. The two candidates spent approximately $350,000 combined with Lucido investing $150,000 of his own money. There were dirty campaign tactics alleged by both sides, with both candidates falsely claiming endorsements from conservative groups. The race's tactics were called a "new low for Macomb politics." Lucido would eventual prevail over Grot by just 103 votes out of the more than 9,400 cast. Lucido would win the general election in the heavily Republican district, defeating Democratic nominee Robert Murphy, taking 70 percent of the vote.

During his 2016 re-election bid, Lucido's opponent Democratic nominee Diane Young filed a complaint with federal and state authorities alleging that Lucido failed to comply with transparency requirements for financial advisors and that he had committed possible campaign finance violations. The Michigan Department of Licensing and Regulatory Affairs and the Michigan Secretary of State both confirmed separate investigations but no official actions were taken against Lucido. Despite the allegations, Lucido was re-elected with 71 percent of the vote.

Lucido decided not to seek a third term in the state House, opting instead to run for the state Senate, seeking the 8th district seat that became vacant by term-limited Republican incumbent Jack Brandenburg. Lucido's only competition for the GOP nominating was former three-term state Rep. Ken Goike. Lucido decisively defeated Goike, taking 72 percent of the vote. Lucido defeated Democratic nominee Paul Francis, taking approximately 62 percent of the vote. Following his election to the State Senate, Lucido was elected majority whip by the Republican Caucus for the 2019-20 legislative session.

Macomb County Prosecutor Election
After a year-long investigation by the Michigan State Police, FBI and the office of the Michigan Attorney General, then-Macomb County Prosecutor Eric Smith was charged with 10 felonies in Macomb County Circuit Court related to public corruption, including embezzlement. Smith announced his resignation on March 30, 2020, in what was later revealed to be a condition plea negotiations between Smith and federal prosecutors in a separate case.

Smith's resignation threw the race for Macomb County Prosecutor into flux as no candidate had filed to run in the race and Michigan's April 21 deadline for candidates to file to seek a partisan office was just 22 days away at the time of Smith's resignation. Lucido announced his candidacy for the Republican nomination just hours after Smith's resignation was announced. Lucido won the GOP nomination by a wide margin, defeating Richard John Goodman, who served in various roles in Macomb's prosecutor's office for almost for 30 years. His opponent was Democratic nominee Mary Chrzanowski, who had spent 24 years as a circuit court judge in Macomb County. Lucido again outraised his opponent by a massive margin, raising $377,000 to Chrzanowski's $118,000. Lucido criticized Chrzanowski for refusing to debate him with Chrzanowski saying she wouldn't agree to the debate because she said Lucido wanted to choose the debate's moderator saying "...I understood this to mean if Mr. Lucido doesn't get to make the rules, he doesn't want to debate me. In an act of desperation, Mr Lucido is again making up false accusations about me."

Lucido defeated Chrzanowski in the general election with approximately 53 percent of the vote, becoming the first Republican elected to the office since 1944.

Allegations of sexual misconduct
Lucido has been accused of sexual harassment by four different women: journalist Allison Donahue, State Senator Mallory McMorrow, lobbyist Melissa Osborn, and an unnamed employee at his Macomb County government office, where he is Macomb County Prosecutor. He has also been accused of inappropriate touching by Ingham County Judge Lisa McCormick.

In January 2020, Lucido attracted controversy for telling Allison Donahue, a 22-year-old female reporter for the Michigan Advance, that a visiting group of teenage boys from De La Salle Collegiate High School could "have a lot of fun" with her if she were to "hang around" with them. The comment was widely interpreted as an instance of sexual harassment, prompting the Senate Business Office of the State of Michigan to open a sexual harassment investigation against Lucido. The controversy was covered in national and international outlets like The New York Times, Teen Vogue, and the BBC News. Lucido initially agreed that he had made these remarks, apologizing for them but asserting that they were not intended to be disparaging, but later reversed his agreement and alleged that he had been misquoted.

McMorrow stated that Lucido touched her lower back and upper buttocks in November 2018, shortly after she was elected to the state senate, and made comments during a training session that suggested she won her election because of her appearance. Osborn said she was handing out name badges at a lunch for legislators when she felt a hand on her "lower back/upper butt." It was Lucido, who she said held his hand there an uncomfortably long time while complimenting her on her appearance and how the plaid dress she was wearing looked on her. His hand "was placed too low and it was uncomfortable and he just talked about my appearance for an extended period of time, a couple of minutes," Osborn said on "Detroit Today" on WDET-FM. Osborn said, "He was looking me up and down and it was very uncomfortable and demeaning." Osborn stated she decided to come forward because her experience was so similar to McMorrow's.

The State Senate investigated the sexual harassment allegations against Lucido. The investigation concluded that Lucido's comments were inappropriate, and as a result Lucido was removed from his committee chairmanship.

Later, Lucido faced renewed controversy over a photo, posted to his own campaign's Facebook page, that shows him with his hand on a woman's behind. Musician Ralphe Armstrong's Facebook page also shared the photo, with a post that said Armstrong and his daughter appeared in the photo with Lucido. Shortly after the photo appeared on Lucido's page, the group Macomb Accountability Project, which oppressed Lucido's election, wrote on its Facebook page: "You’d think someone with 4 sexual harassment complaints would watch their hands."

Personal life 
Lucido is a licensed attorney and he founded the law firm Lucido & Manzella, P.C. He also founded Macomb Now Magazine. Lucido is Roman Catholic.

Lucido and his wife Ann Marie have two daughters, Briana and Nina, and a son, Peter III. All three children attended the University of Michigan. Nina graduated from Michigan State Law School.

Electoral history

References 

Living people
1960 births
American people of Italian descent
Macomb Community College alumni
Oakland University alumni
Central Michigan University alumni
Detroit College of Law alumni
Republican Party members of the Michigan House of Representatives
Michigan lawyers
Republican Party Michigan state senators
Catholics from Michigan
21st-century American politicians
21st-century American lawyers
Politicians from Detroit